The Plaza South Tower is a 20-story office building in downtown Orlando, Florida. The tower was completed in 2006 as part of a three building mixed-use complex known as "The Plaza." The other buildings include the Solaire at the Plaza, residential condominiums, and The Plaza North Tower.

The building has been managed by Vesta Property Services since January 2009.

See also
List of tallest buildings in Orlando
Premiere Trade Plaza Office Tower III
Solaire at the Plaza

References

Skyscraper office buildings in Orlando, Florida
Office buildings completed in 2006
2006 establishments in Florida